Marion College could refer to:

Indiana Wesleyan University, once called Marion College
Marion College (Missouri), historical manual work college founded by David Nelson
Marion College, Virginia, a defunct junior college in Virginia